The Sisu GTP is a Finnish made four-wheeled, modular mine-resistant ambush protected armoured personnel carrier (APC) designed for the Finnish Defence Forces as a possible replacement or complement for its XA-180-series vehicles. The first version was produced in 2019.
In June 2020 the Finnish Defense Forces ordered 6 vehicles for testing.

In December 2022 the Finnish Defence Forces ordered 25 vehicles more. They will replace RG-32M in Finnish service.

Operators
: Finnish Army

See also
Patria Pasi variants
Patria AMV
List of AFVs

References

External links

Gtp
Wheeled armoured personnel carriers
Post–Cold War military vehicles of Finland
Vehicles introduced in 2019
Armoured personnel carriers of Finland
Armoured personnel carriers of the post–Cold War period